The canton of Brétigny-sur-Orge is an administrative division of the Essonne department, Île-de-France region, northern France. Its borders were modified at the French canton reorganisation which came into effect in March 2015. Its seat is in Brétigny-sur-Orge.

It consists of the following communes:
Brétigny-sur-Orge 
Leudeville
Longpont-sur-Orge
Marolles-en-Hurepoix
Saint-Michel-sur-Orge
Saint-Vrain

References

Cantons of Essonne